Syed Ayaz Ali Shah Sheerazi (born 20 August 1976) is a Pakistani politician who has been a member of the National Assembly of Pakistan since August 2018. Previously he was a member of the National Assembly from 2002 to May 2018. He served as Minister of State for National Food Security and Research, in Abbasi cabinet from August 2017 to May 2018.

Early life
He was born on 20 August 1976.

Political career
He was elected to the National Assembly of Pakistan as a candidate of Pakistan Muslim League (Q) (PML-Q) from Constituency NA-237 (Thatta-I) in 2002 Pakistani general election. He received 57,195 votes and defeated Abdul Wahid Soomro, a candidate of Pakistan Peoples Party (PPP). In the same election, he ran for the seat of the Provincial Assembly of Sindh as a candidate of PML-Q from Constituency PS-85 (Thatta-II) but was unsuccessful. He received 15,026 votes and lost the seat to Sassui Palijo.

He was re-elected to the National Assembly as a candidate of PML-Q from Constituency NA-238 (Thatta-II) in 2008 Pakistani general election. He received 76,812 votes and defeated Arbab Wazir Ahmed Memon, a candidate of PPP. In the same election, he ran for the seat of the Provincial Assembly of Sindh as an independent candidate from Constituency PS-85 (Thatta-II) but was unsuccessful. He received 52 votes and lost the seat to Sassui Palijo.

He was re-elected to the National Assembly as an independent candidate from Constituency NA-238 (Thatta-II) in 2013 Pakistani general election. He received 88,954 votes and defeated Rameez u din Memon, a candidate of PPP.

Following the election of Shahid Khaqan Abbasi as Prime Minister of Pakistan in August 2017, he was inducted into the cabinet of Abbasi as Minister of State for National Food Security and Research. Upon the dissolution of the National Assembly on the expiration of its term on 31 May 2018, Sheerazi ceased to hold the office as Minister of State for National Food Security and Research.

He was re-elected to the National Assembly as a candidate of PPP from Constituency NA-231 (Sujawal) in 2018 Pakistani general election.

References

Living people
Sindhi people
Pakistani MNAs 2013–2018
People from Sindh
1976 births
Pakistani MNAs 2008–2013
Pakistani MNAs 2002–2007
Pakistani MNAs 2018–2023